Máret Ánne Sara (born 1983) is a Sami artist and author born in Norway. She lives and works in Kautokeino.

Early life and education
Máret Ánne Sara was born in Hammerfest and grew up in Finnmark county in a reindeer herding family that had its summer pasture on Kvaløya. 

She received her education in art from Arts University Bournemouth in the United Kingdom.

Art 
Sara's art focuses on Sami identity and livelihood, specifically as it relates to reindeer herding. For example, "Spirals of the Pile" (2018) uses reindeer jaws and "Gielstuvvon" (2018) uses lassos

Sara's work was shown at the Sami Pavillion during the 59th International Art Exhibition of the 2022 Venice Biennial. Included pieces were "Gutted – Gávogálši" (2022) which uses reindeer stomachs, "Ale suova sielu sáiget" (2022), which uses cured reindeer calves and tundra plants, and "Du-ššan-ahttanu-ššan", which uses reindeer sinew. "Gutted – Gávogálši" was bought by the National Museum of Norway later that year.

Also in 2022, Sara was part of the Arctic/Amazon show at the Power Plant gallery in Toronto, Canada.

Pile O'Sapmi 
"Pile O'Sapmi" was created in 2016 in response to the Norwegian government's culling of reindeer belonging to Sapmi herders. The project includes 400 reindeer skulls. It was featured in the documenta 14 exhibition in 2017.

In 2022 "Pile O’Sapmi" was installed in the vestibule of the newly opened National Museum in Oslo

Works 
 Ilmmiid gaskkas (Between Worlds), young adult fantasy novel, Kautokeino, Norway: DAT, 2013
 Doaresbealde doali, young adult fantasy novel, Kautokeino, Norway: DAT, 2014

Awards 
She was nominated for the Nordic Council Children and Young People's Literature Prize in 2014 for her Sami-language young adult fantasy novel Ilmmiid gaskkas (Between Worlds).

References 

Norwegian Sámi-language writers
Norwegian women writers
Norwegian artists
Norwegian writers of young adult literature
1983 births
Norwegian Sámi people
People from Hammerfest
People from Kautokeino
Living people
Alumni of Arts University Bournemouth